Charles Germain de Saint Aubin (17 January 1721 – 6 March 1786) was a French draftsman and embroidery designer to King Louis XV. Published a classic reference on embroidery, L'Art du Brodeur ("Art of the Embroiderer") in 1770.  In addition to his embroidery designs, he was known for his drawings and engravings.

His parents were Germain de Saint-Aubin and Anne Boissay, themselves both professional embroiderers. His younger brothers, Gabriel-Jacques de Saint-Aubin and Augustin de Saint-Aubin, were also well-respected artists. His daughter, Marie-François, was an artist as well.

References

Sources
 E. et J. de Goncourt, L'Art du XVIIIe siècle, Les Saint-Aubin
 Charles Germain de Saint-Aubin, Works of Art (National Gallery of Art)
 Men in the fiber arts.
 Textile Production in Europe: Embroidery, 1600–1800 (Metropolitan Museum of Art)
 E. and J. de Goncourt, The Art of the eighteenth century, the Saint-Aubin
 Catalog of rare and valuable component library M. Hippolyte Destailleur; Paris books: D. Morgand, 1891. 8 °, 448 p.

External links

Saint-Aubin, The Livre de caricatures tant bonnes que mauvaises ('The Book of Caricatures Both Good and Bad’), Waddesdon Manor

1721 births
1786 deaths
Embroidery designers
French designers
French draughtsmen
18th-century French artists